Pierre Jacquinot (18 January 1910 – 22 September 2002) was a French physicist.

Jacquinot was a PhD student of Aimé Cotton.
He was director of Laboratoire Aimé-Cotton during almost 20 years (1951-1962 and 1969-1978). From 1962 to 1969 he was appointed director general of CNRS.

In 1966 he entered the French Academy of Sciences. He became its president from 1980 to 1982.

Awards
 Jacquinot's advantage
 1950: Fernand Holweck Medal and Prize
 1976: Three Physicists Prize
 1978: CNRS Gold medal

References

1910 births
2002 deaths
French physicists
Members of the French Academy of Sciences
Optical physicists
Research directors of the French National Centre for Scientific Research